The Local Government Act 1888 (51 & 52 Vict. c.41) was an Act of Parliament which established county councils and county borough councils in England and Wales.  It came into effect on 1 April 1889, except for the County of London, which came into existence on 21 March at the request of the London County Council.

The Bill
Following the 1886 general election, a Conservative administration headed by Lord Salisbury was formed. However the Conservatives did not have a majority of seats and had to rely on the support of the Liberal Unionist Party. As part of the price for this support the Liberal Unionists  demanded that a bill be introduced placing county government under the control of elected councils, modelled on the borough councils introduced by the Municipal Corporations Act 1835.

Accordingly, the Local Government (England and Wales) Bill was introduced to the House of Commons on 19 March 1888, by the President of the Local Government Board, Charles Ritchie. The Bill proposed the creation of elected county councils to take over the administrative functions of the magistrates of the Quarter Sessions courts, that ten large cities should be "counties of themselves" for the purposes of local government and that each county was to be divided into urban and rural districts, based on existing sanitary districts, governed by a district council. The county and district councils were to consist partly of directly elected "elective councillors" and partly of "selected councillors", chosen by the elective councillors in a similar manner to aldermen in municipal boroughs.

The counties to be used for local government were to be the historic counties of England and Wales. A county council was to be formed for each of the ridings of Yorkshire and the three divisions of Lincolnshire (Holland, Kesteven and Lindsey). In addition a new County of London was to be formed from the area of the Metropolitan Board of Works. This would have led to the creation of fifty-seven county councils. The boundaries of the counties were to be those used for parliamentary purposes, adjusted to include urban sanitary districts on county borders within a single county.

The ten cities first identified to be dealt with as separate counties were Liverpool, Birmingham, Manchester, Leeds, Sheffield, Bristol, Bradford, Nottingham, Kingston-on-Hull, and Newcastle upon Tyne.

Existing urban and rural sanitary districts, created in 1872, were to be redesignated as urban and rural districts. Urban such districts that straddled counties became destined for the county with the bulk of their population as at the 1881 census, by enlarging the latter. Existing rural sanitary districts so straddling were to split on county lines to form rural districts.

Passage through Parliament
There were a large number of changes to the Bill as it passed through parliament. The terms administrative county and county borough were introduced to designate the new areas of local government, while the "selected councillors" became "county aldermen". The government withdrew the sections relating to the creation of district councils, which were eventually brought into existence by the Local Government Act 1894.

Members of both houses made representations on behalf of counties and boroughs, and this led to an increase in the number of local authorities.
The eastern and western divisions of Sussex became administrative counties
The Isle of Ely was separated from Cambridgeshire
The eastern and western divisions of Suffolk were divided for local government purposes.
The Soke of Peterborough was separated from the remainder of Northamptonshire.

Attempts to create administrative counties for the Cinque Ports and Staffordshire Potteries were not successful.

The normal population threshold for county borough status was lowered twice, firstly to 100,000, then to 50,000. A number of smaller counties corporate were also given county borough status. Mr Ritchie conceded on 8 June:

"Now that they had gone down so far in population as 50,000 there arose a question as to the admission of boroughs which had not so large a population as 50,000, but which had very peculiar claims. He referred to the counties of cities. [...] Two or three of these cities had so small a population that he did not propose to deal with them in this way. The best course was to give the names of the cities which he proposed to include. They were Exeter, Lincoln, Chester, Gloucester, Worcester, and Canterbury."

The effect of these changes was to increase the number of county boroughs from ten to fifty-nine. With a population of around 50,000 at the 1881 census, the City of London was initially proposed for county borough status.

County councils
These were subject to triennial elections, the first taking place in January 1889. Those elected in 1889 were known as "provisional" councils until coming into their powers on 1 April. The divisions of the county for the purpose of the election of county councillors became fixed, under a key definition of the Act, "as electoral divisions and not wards", and "one county councillor only shall be elected for each". Following the election, the county councillors then elected county aldermen, there being one alderman for every three councillors. The London County Council had its own section of the Act, prescribing two councillors to be elected for each Commons constituency, and a ratio of "not more than" one alderman to six councillors. The councillors appointed the council's "Chairman instead of mayor" and Vice Chairman, who had a one-year term of office and could be reappointed. As to natural persons section 1 of the Act states every such council shall "consist of the chairman, aldermen, and councillors".  The Chairman would upon (this ex officio, by virtue of office) the selecting of that person (co-option) be entitled to be a Justice of the Peace but needed take the oaths of that office "before acting as such justice", aside from the oath as to having local real estate as they had already met the equivalent requirement to become a councillor or alderman.

Powers
The powers and responsibilities transferred from the quarter sessions to the councils were enumerated in the Act. These included:
Making and levying of rates
Borrowing of money
Passing of county accounts
Maintenance and construction of county buildings such as shire halls, county halls, court houses and police stations
Licensing of places of entertainment and of race courses
Provisions of asylums for pauper lunatics
Establishment and maintenance of reformatory and industrial schools
Repair of county roads and bridges
Appointment, dismissal and setting of salaries for county officers
Division of the county into polling places for parliamentary elections, and the provision of polling stations
Control of contagious diseases in animals, and of destructive insects
Fish conservancy and control of wild birds
Weights and measures

County borough corporations also exercised these powers, in addition to those of a municipal borough.

Standing joint committees
Control of the county police was to be exercised jointly by the quarter sessions and the county council through a standing joint committee. The committees were replaced by police authorities by the Police Act 1964.

Counties for other purposes
The Act ensured that the boundaries used for what it self-defined as "non-administrative purposes" would match the borders set between the administrative counties. These purposes were stated to be "sheriff, lieutenant, custos rotulorum, justices, militia, coroner, or other", thus approximating to the functions of modern ceremonial counties.

The counties of Cambridgeshire, Lincolnshire, Northamptonshire, Suffolk, Sussex and Yorkshire were undivided so far as they were one county at the passing of the Act. The three ridings of Yorkshire and the three parts of Lincolnshire therefore retained their status.

County boroughs were to be administrative counties of themselves.  The Act provided that each county borough that had previously been part of a county (i.e., was not a county corporate) should continue to be part of that county for non-administrative purposes.  If a county borough did not have a separate commission of assize, oyer and terminer and jury service, or gaol delivery, it was deemed to be part of one or more adjoining counties for those purposes.  The Act also provided for certain financial adjustments between county boroughs and adjoining counties.

The Act did not in terms affect the status of cities and towns which were counties corporate.  Most of the counties corporate became county boroughs and therefore administrative counties of themselves, but while other county boroughs continued to be part of their existing counties for all other purposes, that did not apply to existing counties corporate.  Those that did not become county boroughs became part of adjacent administrative counties but retained their existing lieutenancies and shrievalties.

Other provisions
Under section 48 of the Act all liberties and franchises, with the exception of those that became separate administrative counties, merged with the county they formed part of for parliamentary elections. The Cinque Ports, together with "the two ancient towns and their members" (which for some purposes, such as lieutenancy, were considered a distinct county), were to become part of the county where they were situated. Section 49 allowed for the creation by provisional order of a Council for the Scilly Islands to be established as a unitary authority outside the administrative county of Cornwall. This was duly formed in 1890 as the Isles of Scilly Rural District.

List of administrative counties and county boroughs created in 1889

England

Wales

Towns on county boundaries
Thirty-five urban (until the Act took effect only sanitary) districts straddled counties. County boundaries were thus changed as set out in Bill, above.

See also

 History of local government in England
 History of local government in Wales

References

Local government in the United Kingdom
United Kingdom Acts of Parliament 1888
Local government legislation in England and Wales
Roads in the United Kingdom
Transport policy in the United Kingdom
London County Council
Metropolitan Board of Works